Credit Foncier is the name of

 Crédit Foncier de France, a mortgage bank in France.
 Credit Foncier of America, a defunct real estate company in the U.S.